Seetharama Kalyanam is a 1986 Telugu-language drama film, produced K. Murari of Yuva Chitra Arts and directed by Jandhyala. It stars Nandamuri Balakrishna, Rajani and music composed by K. V. Mahadevan.

Plot 
The film is a tale of strife between two villages, Ramapuram & Raghavapuram for the statues of Lord Rama & Seeta. Govindaiah the top-tier of Ramapuram wedlock's his daughter Janaki with Rangaiah a leadoff of Raghavapuram and they live merrily. A sweet crush blossoms between Rangaiah's younger brother Raja and Govindaiah's younger brother Subbaramaiah's daughter Lakshmi. Once, they unearth idols of Lord Rama & Seeta while playing within the borders of two villages. Therefore, bloodshed occurs between the two in which Rangaiah's father dies in hands of Subbaramaiah, and infuriated Rangaiah slaughters him. As a result, discord arises in families, and warfare is declared among little Raja & Hari son of Subbaramaiah. Afterward, judicial proceedings run for the statutes, Rangaiah is penalized for life, and Govindaiah shifts to the city with Hari & Lakshmi. Years roll by, Rangaiah acquits, and the tribunal is still prolonged. Destiny makes Raja & Lakshmi study in the same college and their childhood love continues. Knowing it, Govindaiah & Hari hinder and splits them. Exploiting it, Govindaiah's foxy brother-in-law Narayana plots to knit Lakshmi with his son Varma. At that time, Rangaiah is accidentally killed by Hari & Naryana and the incident makes Govindaiah realize. Hence, he decides to couple up Raja & Lakshmi. However, Hari forcibly takes away Lakshmi when Raja flares and reforms him. Finally, the movie ends on a happy note with all the villagers together performing the festival ceremony of deities along with the marriage of Raja and Lakshmi.

Cast 

Nandamuri Balakrishna as Raja
Rajani as Lakshmi
Gollapudi Maruti Rao as Narayana
Jaggayya as Govindaiah
Sreedhar as Police Officer
Ramakrishna as Rangaiah
Suthi Velu as Librarian
Rajesh as Hari
Girish as Varma
Subhalekha Sudhakar as Maruthi
Telephone Satyanarayana as Lawyer
Ch. Krishna Murthy as Subbaramaiah
 M. Vasudeva Murthy as College Principal
Jeeva as Villager
Rama Prabha as Narayana's wife
Sangeetha as Janaki
Mucharlla Aruna as Latha
Kalpana Rai as Librarian's wife

Soundtrack 

The music was composed by K. V. Mahadevan and released by AVM Audio Company.

References 

1986 films
1980s Telugu-language films
Films directed by Jandhyala
Films scored by K. V. Mahadevan